The Banu Shayban is an Arab tribe, a branch of the Bakr ibn Wa'il group. Throughout the early Islamic era, the tribe was settled chiefly in the Jazira, and played an important role in its history.

History 
In the pre-Islamic period, the Shayban with their flocks wandered according to the seasons, wintering in Jadiyya in the Najd and moving to the fertile lowlands around the Euphrates for the summer, ranging from the Jazira in the north to lower Iraq and the shores of the Persian Gulf. Its chief opponents during this time were the Banu Taghlib and Banu Tamim tribes. Already from pre-Islamic times, the tribe was "celebrated ... for the remarkable quality of its poets, its use of a very pure form of Arabic language and its fighting ardour" (Th. Bianquis), a reputation its members retained into the Islamic period, when histories remark both on their own skills as, and on their patronage of, poets.

During the time of Muhammad and his immediate successors, the Shayban were allies of the Banu Hashim (the clan to which Muhammad belonged). During the Muslim conquest of Persia, the Shaybani al-Muthanna ibn Haritha played a leading role in the conquest of Iraq. For the most part the Shayban remained active, as in pre-Islamic times, mainly in Mesopotamia, but especially in the district of Diyar Bakr, where they settled in numbers, and from there to the adjacent Armenian Highland. By virtue of this proximity, the Shayban would play an important role in the history of early Islamic Armenia and Azerbaijan. A few isolated groups and individuals of the tribe are also attested in northern Syria and Khurasan, such as Abu Dawud Khalid ibn Ibrahim al-Dhuhli al-Shaybani, a follower of Abu Muslim.

In Umayyad times, the Shayban remained powerful in the Jazira. Shabib ibn Yazid ibn Nu'aym al-Shaybani was able to raise a large-scale Kharijite-inspired revolt in the 690s against al-Hajjaj ibn Yusuf, as did al-Dahhak ibn Qays al-Shaybani in 745–746. Under the early Abbasids, the most prominent Shaybani were the family of Ma'n ibn Za'ida, a former Umayyad servant who secured the pardon of al-Mansur. His sons and especially his nephews, Yazid ibn Mazyad and Ahmad ibn Mazyad, occupied high offices. Yazid ibn Mazyad served Caliph Harun al-Rashid with success as general, even subduing a Kharijite revolt under the fellow Shaybani al-Walid ibn Tarif al-Shari, while his brother Ahmad went with 20,000 tribesmen to the aid of Caliph al-Amin in the civil war against al-Ma'mun. Yazid also served twice as governor of Arminiya (a vast province encompassing Armenia and Azerbaijan), where carried out large-scale colonization with Arab Muslims, particularly at Shirvan. He was succeeded by his sons Asad, Muhammad and Khalid, becoming the first of a long line of Shaybani governors and the progenitor of the Mazyadid dynasty that ruled in Shirvan as autonomous and later independent emirs (Shirvanshah) until 1027.

Another successful Shaybani line was that of Isa ibn al-Shaykh al-Shaybani, governor in Syria and Arminiya in the 860s–880s. His son Ahmad exploited the chaos following the "Anarchy at Samarra" and established himself as the strongest ruler of the Jazira, controlling Diyar Bakr and the Armenian borderlands of Taron and Antzitene, although he faced competition from the Taghlibi Hamdan ibn Hamdun and the Turk Ishaq ibn Kundajiq, ruler of Mosul. Ahmad managed to capture Mosul after Ibn Kundajiq's death, but was driven out by the resurgent Abbasid Caliphate under al-Mu'tadid in 893. After his death in 898, al-Mu'tadid seized the last possession of the family, Amid, and imprisoned Ahmad's son Muhammad.

The Shayban as a whole are not frequently mentioned in the later centuries, as opposed to its many sub-tribes or splinter groups originating from it. Some Shayban are mentioned in later times in southern Iraq as poets, grammarians and philologists, chief among them the Shaybani mawla Abu Amr Ishaq ibn Mirar al-Shaybani (died 825). Members of the tribe are also mentioned among the early followers of the Qarmatians in the Sawad of Iraq, and again in northern Syria in the late 10th and 11th centuries, after which "the tribe of Shayban as such is less often mentioned, and it is difficult to follow the subsequent fortunes of this highly-fragmented group" (Thierry Bianquis).

But still Arabs from the Diyar Bakr region in Turkey are tracing their tribal origins back to this tribe. Some families are even claiming descendant from the famous Isa ibn al-Shaykh al-Shaybani line. However the Banu Shayban of Southeastern Anatolia are organized loose and they do not have a Sheikh as a head of their tribe, like it is common in Arab countries.

References

Sources
 
 
 
 

 
Shayban
Medieval Upper Mesopotamia
Arminiya
History of Diyarbakır Province
Rabi`ah